The Darkey Flat Massacre is a massacre of Aboriginal Australians by European settlers that supposedly took place some time in the 1840s. There is no eyewitness, first-hand, or clear documentary evidence relating to the massacre and there is some doubt as to whether it actually occurred.

References

Darling Downs
History of Queensland
1845 in Australia
Massacres of Indigenous Australians